Its location in the center of Africa has made the Democratic Republic of the Congo (at one time known as Zaire) a key player in the region since independence. Because of its size, mineral wealth, and strategic location, Zaire was able to capitalize on Cold War tensions to garner support from the West. In the early 1990s, however, with the end of the Cold War and in the face of growing evidence of human rights abuses, Western support waned as pressure for internal reform increased.

The Democratic Republic of the Congo is in the grip of a civil war that has drawn in military forces from neighboring states, with Ugandan, Burundian, and Rwandan forces helping the rebel movement which occupies much of the eastern portion of the state.

One problem is the continuing theft of mineral resources, such as coltan, by occupying forces. One estimate has the Rwandan army making $350 million in 48 months from the sale of coltan, even though Rwanda has no coltan deposits. Not only can the DRC not make any money from its mineral wealth, due to its inability to tax anything in rebel-held areas, but the wealth is also used itself to finance insurgent activities.

Troops from Zimbabwe, Angola, Namibia, Chad, and Sudan support the Kinshasa regime.

Furthermore, relations with surrounding countries have often been driven by security concerns. Intricate and interlocking alliances have often characterized regional relations. Conflicts in Sudan, Uganda, Angola, Rwanda, and Burundi have at various times created bilateral and regional tensions. The current crisis in DRC has its roots both in the use of The Congo as a base by various insurgency groups attacking neighboring countries and in the absence of a broad-based political system in the Congo.

The Democratic Republic of the Congo is also a member of the International Criminal Court with a Bilateral Immunity Agreement of protection for the U.S.-military (as covered under Article 98).

Disputes – international

Democratic Republic of the Congo is in the grip of a civil war that has drawn in military forces from neighboring states, with Uganda and Rwanda supporting the rebel movements that occupy much of the eastern portion of the state – Tutsi, Hutu, Lendu, Hema and other conflicting ethnic groups, political rebels, and various government forces continue fighting in Great Lakes region, transcending the boundaries of Burundi, Democratic Republic of the Congo, Rwanda, and Uganda – heads of the Great Lakes states pledge to end conflict, but localized violence continues despite UN peacekeeping efforts; most of the Congo River boundary with the Republic of the Congo is indefinite (no agreement has been reached on the division of the river or its islands, except in the Pool Malebo/Stanley Pool area).

On December 19, 2005, the International Court of Justice found against Uganda, in a case brought by the Democratic Republic of the Congo, for illegal invasion of its territory, and violation of human rights.

Illicit drugs

The DRC has some illicit production of cannabis, mostly for domestic consumption.  While rampant corruption and inadequate supervision leaves the banking system vulnerable to money laundering, the lack of a well-developed financial system limits the country's utility as a money-laundering center.

Bilateral relations

Africa

Americas

Asia

Europe

See also
 List of diplomatic missions in the Democratic Republic of the Congo
 List of diplomatic missions of the Democratic Republic of the Congo

References